The Get Closer 2011 World Tour was the seventh headlining tour by Australian country music singer Keith Urban, in support of his seventh studio album Get Closer (2010). It began on 8 April 2011 in Adelaide, Australia and ended on 15 October 2011 in Minneapolis, Minnesota. The tour visited both Australia and North America.

Background
The Australian leg of the tour was first announced 13 December 2010. The North American leg of the tour was first announced on 22 November 2010.

Opening acts
Lady Antebellum (Australia & North America)
Jake Owen (North America)

Setlist
"Put You in a Song"
"I Told You So"
"Long Hot Summer"
"Stupid Boy"
"Days Go By"
"Silly Love Songs" (Wings cover)
"You Gonna Fly"
"Making Memories of Us"
"I'm In"
"Boondocks" (Little Big Town cover)
"Jeans On" 
"You'll Think of Me"
"Georgia Woods"
"'Til Summer Comes Around"
"Sweet Thing"
"Kiss a Girl"
"Without You"
"Somebody Like You"
"Are You Sure Hank Done It This Way" (Waylon Jennings cover)
"Who Wouldn't Wanna Be Me"
"With or Without You" (U2 cover)
"American Girl" (Tom Petty and the Heartbreakers cover)
"It's a Long Way to the Top (If You Wanna Rock 'n' Roll)" (AC/DC cover)
"You Look Good in My Shirt"
Encore
"Raining on Sunday"
"Tonight I Wanna Cry"
"Better Life"

Tour dates

References

External links

2011 concert tours
Keith Urban concert tours